Grapsh (romanized: Grápsi) is a village in Gjirokastër County, southern Albania. At the 2015 local government reform it became part of the municipality of Dropull. It is inhabited solely by Greeks.

Demographics 
In the Ottoman register of 1520 for the Sanjak of Avlona, Grapsh was attested a village in the region of Dropull. The village had a total of 60 households and the anthroponymy attested belonged almost entirely to the Albanian onomastic sphere, characterised by personal names such as Bardh, Deda, Gjin, Gjon, Kola, Leka, and others. The village also had a small number Muslim households.       

According to Ottoman statistics, the village had 341 inhabitants in 1895. The village had 512 inhabitants in 1993, all ethnically Greeks.

References

External links 
Different views of Grapsh

Villages in Gjirokastër County
Greek communities in Albania